Gianni Basso,  (24 May 1931 – 17 August 2009), was an Italian jazz tenor saxophonist, who was influenced by Stan Getz. 

He was born in Asti, Italy. He started his career shortly after World War II, at first as a clarinetist, then switching to the saxophone in the Belgian Raoul Faisant's Big Band. Basso worked with a number of touring American jazz musicians, including Chet Baker, Buddy Collette, Slide Hampton, Maynard Ferguson, Phil Woods and Gerry Mulligan.

Quote

See also
Oscar Valdambrini

References

External links
a jazz listener's thoughts: A Saxophone Giant You Probably Never Heard: Gianni Basso
Gianni Basso | Biography & History

1931 births
2009 deaths
Jazz tenor saxophonists
Italian jazz musicians
Italian saxophonists
Male saxophonists
20th-century Italian musicians
20th-century saxophonists
20th-century Italian male musicians
Male jazz musicians